is a Japanese manga artist famous for his sports stories. Chiba's works include Ashita no Joe, his best known work, and Notari Matsutarō. Many of his early titles are still in print due to continued popularity.

Life
He was born in Chuo, Tokyo, Japan, but lived most of his early childhood in Shenyang, Liaoning when northeast China was colonized by Japan during the Second Sino-Japanese War. His father was working in a paper factory when they lived in China.

At the end of the Sino-Japanese War, Chiba's family lived in the attic of a work-acquaintance of his father until they could find a way to get back to Japan. Two of his younger brothers are manga artists: Akio Chiba, and Shigeyuki Chiba who is almost completely unknown outside Japan, despite writing many popular sports manga in Japan. Shigeyuki Chiba works under the pen name Taro Nami.

In 1950, while in elementary school, he made a manga club with his friends. He created his first official manga, Fukushu no Semushi, (The Hunchback Avenger), in 1956. In 1958, he made his professional debut in Shōjo Book with Butōkai no Shōjo. In the 1960s, he wrote shōnen and shōjo manga at the same time. In 1965 he married his wife, Yukiko. He is personally friends with Moto Hagio and Leiji Matsumoto.

He has received several awards for his manga, including the Kodansha Children's Manga Award for 1, 2, 3, & 4, 5, 6, Kodansha Culture Award for Ore wa Teppei, and the Japanese Cartoonist Association Award and Shogakukan Manga Award for Notari Matsutaro. In 2001 he was awarded the Award from Ministry of Education, Culture, Sports, Science and Technology for his work on youth sports manga. In July 2012 he was appointed as the chairman of the Japan Cartoonists Association after Takashi Yanase stepped down due to age and health reasons. In Fall 2012 he was awarded with the Order of the Rising Sun, Gold Rays with Rosette, by the Japanese government.

Chiba's series Harris no Kaze, Ashita no Joe, Akane-chan, Ore wa Teppei, Ashita Tenki ni Naare and Notari Masutaro have all received anime adaptations. Yuki no Taiyou received a short pilot film in 1972, which was Hayao Miyazaki's solo directorial debut, and an animated film for Kaze no Yo ni premiered in June 2016.

In 2015, he left retirement in order to work on the series Hinemosu no Tari Nikki for Big Comic magazine. The manga is an autobiographical manga about his childhood, experiences from the war and his career as a manga artist. Naoki Urasawa's TV show Urasawa Naoki no Manben featured Chiba's drawing process on the series in 2020.

He lives in Nerima, Tokyo. In January 2022, he successfully underwent heart surgery at the age of 82 and then continued working on his current series.

Selected works
Listed chronologically.
Chikai no Makyū (Weekly Shōnen Magazine, Kodansha, Jan 1961–Dec 1962, created by Kazuya Fukumoto)
1•2•3 to 4•5•Roku (Shōjo Club, Kodansha, Jan–Dec 1962)
Shidenkai no Taka (Weekly Shōnen Magazine, July 1963–January 1965)
Harris no Kaze (Weekly Shōnen Magazine, Apr 1965-Nov 1967)
Misokkasu (Shōjo Friend, Kodansha, August 1966–August 1967)
Ashita no Joe (Weekly Shōnen Magazine, January 1968–June 1973, written by Asao Takamori)
Akane-chan (Shōjo Friend, April 6, 1968–September 29, 1968)
Kaze no Yō ni (Shojo Friend, 1969)
Hotaru Minako (Weekly Shōnen Magazine, September 1972)
Ore wa Teppei (Weekly Shōnen Magazine, August 1973–April 1980)
Notari Matsutarō (Big Comic, Shogakukan, August 1973–June 1993 and October 1995–May 1998)
Ashita Tenki ni Naare (Weekly Shōnen Magazine, January 1981–May 1991)
Shōnen yo Racket o Idake (Weekly Shōnen Magazine, May 1992–June 1994)
Hinemosu no Tari Nikki (ひねもすのたり日記, Big Comic, since December 2015)

References

External links
 Chiba Tetsuya's blog 
 
 Chiba Tetsuya Profile 

1939 births
Manga artists from Tokyo
People from Chūō, Tokyo
Living people
Recipients of the Order of the Rising Sun, 4th class
Recipients of the Medal with Purple Ribbon
Persons of Cultural Merit